Byju Raveendran (Malayalam: ബൈജു  രവീന്ദ്രൻ; born 1980) is an Indian entrepreneur, investor and educator who, with his wife Divya Gokulnath, co-founded Byju's.

Early life and education
Byju was born in 1980 in the Azhikode village of Kerala, India to Raveendran and Shobhanavalli, physics and mathematics teachers, respectively. He studied at a Malayalam medium school where his mother was a mathematics teacher and father a physics teacher. He would skip classes and then learn at home.

Career 
After completing his B.Tech from the Government College of Engineering, Kannur, he joined a multinational shipping company as a service engineer. During a vacation in 2003, he helped his friends who were studying for the CAT exam. He then took the CAT exam and scored in the 100th percentile. When he took the exam again, he again scored in the 100th percentile. Two years later, he continued helping people study for the CAT exam, and based on the good results, decided to quit his job.

In 2007, Byju founded the test preparation business Byju's Classes, and the company grew to stadium-size classes. In 2011, he founded Byju's with his wife, Divya Gokulnath, who he met while she was a student in his exam preparation class.

In 2015, as smartphone screen sizes increased, Byju's launched an app developed by Raveendran for students to learn on their handheld devices. In October 2018, the app expanded to the United Kingdom, United States and other English-speaking countries. By July 2022, the app had been downloaded more than 150 million times, and on average, its users spent 71 minutes on the app every day.

In 2021, Raveendran was heading advanced talks to acquire Vedantu for around $600-$700 million, but the deal didn't get through due to pending regulatory approvals.

According to Forbes, as of 2020,  Byju, his wife, and his brother Riju Raveendran, have a combined net worth of $3.4 billion. In January 2021, he was added to the National Startup Advisory Council as a non-official member. In April 2021, Byju's purchased the Indian test-prep provider Aakash Educational Services Ltd. for nearly  billion.

In July 2022, Raveendran invested $400 million in BYJU’S in his personal capacity to further increase his stake in the company.

Philanthropy
Byju is spearheading the Education for All Initiative, under which 10 million children in India from various economic backgrounds will get access to new tech-driven learning solutions at Byju's platforms.

Personal life 
Raveendran married Divya Gokulnath, who was one of his early students, in 2009. Together they have two sons.

Honors and awards
 2017 The Indian Express IT Awards
 2019 Manorama News Newsmaker award
 2020 Ernst & Young Finalist, Entrepreneur of the Year, India and Winner, Business Transformation Award
 2020 Fortune Magazine's '40 Under 40' list
 2021 Forbes India Leadership Award (FILA) Entrepreneur for the Year

References

Indian company founders
Living people
Indian billionaires
People from Kannur district
Businesspeople from Kannur
Byju's
1980 births